Raidel Acea Morales (born 21 October 1990) is a Cuban-born track and field athlete who competes for Portugal in the 400 metres and 800 metres events. The 2009 Pan American junior champion over 800 m, he won the bronze medal in the event at the 2011 Pan American Games.

Born and raised in the Cuban city of Cienfuegos, Acea began taking part in athletics at the age of ten and started out as a 400 m runner. As he grew older, he began running in the 800 m as well upon the advice of the coaches at his local high performance sports centre. His first successes came at the age of eighteen in the 2009 season. After placing third at the Rafael Fortún Memorial he claimed the 800 m silver medal at the 2009 ALBA Games. He ran an 800 m best of 1:46.68 minutes for third at the Barrientos Memorial in May then ran a 400 m personal best of 46.19 seconds the following month. His season ended on a high as he won the 800 m title for Cuba at the 2009 Pan American Junior Athletics Championships.

In 2010, Acea faltered in his first year as a senior athlete. He managed third over 800 m at both the Barrientos meet and the Olimpiada del Deporte Cubano, but did not improve in his performances. Acea judged that he needed the season to adjust to the higher senior level. He made his senior breakthrough the very next season, starting with an 800 m win at the Copa Cuba national championships, where he was also second over 400 m. A duel between Acea and his more senior rival Andy González proved to be a highlight of the Barrientos Memorial, and it was the younger Cuban who won and set a personal best of 1:45.62 minutes. He won medals at the 2011 ALBA Games, claiming the 800 m title and taking a silver medal with Cuba's 4×400 metres relay team. He was chosen to represent Cuba at the 2011 Pan American Games and while his older compatriot González won the 800 m title, Acea earned the bronze medal with his sprint finish. He reached the podium for a second time at the event as part of Cuba's 4 × 400 m relay squad: Noel Ruíz, Acea, Omar Cisneros and William Collazo dipped under three minutes to win the relay gold.

Personal bests
 400 m: 45.18 s –  La Habana, 26 May 2015
 800 m: 1:45.62 min –  La Habana, 28 May 2011

Achievements

References

External links
 
 
 Tilastopaja biography

1990 births
Living people
People from Cienfuegos
Athletes (track and field) at the 2011 Pan American Games
Cuban male sprinters
Cuban male middle-distance runners
Portuguese male sprinters
Athletes (track and field) at the 2012 Summer Olympics
Athletes (track and field) at the 2016 Summer Olympics
Olympic athletes of Cuba
Pan American Games bronze medalists for Cuba
World Athletics Championships athletes for Cuba
Pan American Games gold medalists for Cuba
Pan American Games medalists in athletics (track and field)
S.L. Benfica athletes
Central American and Caribbean Games gold medalists for Cuba
Competitors at the 2014 Central American and Caribbean Games
Central American and Caribbean Games medalists in athletics
Medalists at the 2011 Pan American Games